Gabriel Omar Briceño Leyva (born 30 January 1978) is a Mexican former footballer, who last played for Dorados de Sinaloa in Liga de Ascenso.

Club career
He debuted with Club Atlas in 1997, and played with them until 2002, when he moved to Tigres UANL. In 2007, he left Tigres, and had short spells with Veracruz and Puebla FC before joining Dorados in January 2009.

International career
Briceno was capped on 19 occasions by the Mexico national team between 2003 and 2006.

Managerial statistics

Managerial statistics

References

External links

1978 births
Living people
Sportspeople from Culiacán
Footballers from Sinaloa
Association football defenders
Mexican footballers
Mexico under-20 international footballers
Mexico international footballers
CONCACAF Gold Cup-winning players
2003 CONCACAF Gold Cup players
2004 Copa América players
Atlas F.C. footballers
Tigres UANL footballers
C.D. Veracruz footballers
Club Puebla players
Dorados de Sinaloa footballers
Liga MX players